Acontias plumbeus, the giant legless skink or giant lance skink, is a species of lizard in the family Scincidae. It is found in South Africa, Eswatini, Mozambique, and Zimbabwe.

References

Acontias
Reptiles described in 1849
Taxa named by Giovanni Giuseppe Bianconi